In the Battle of the Cunene River, Portuguese Colonial forces were defeated by Angolan Ovambo warriors on 25 September 1904. The defeat was one of the heaviest defeats in Portuguese Colonial history since Alcácer Quibir (1578) and is comparable to the British defeat at Isandhlwana against the Zulus (1879), the Italian defeats at Dogali (1887) and at Adwa (1896) against the Ethiopians or the Spanish defeats at Melilla (1909) and at Annual (1921) against the Rif.

After having subdued the Nkhumbi people, Portuguese troops advanced from Huila southward into territories which were just claimed by Portugal but not yet under control. At Cunene River they were confronted with the resistance of two Ovambo peoples, the Cuamato and Cuanhama, led by their king Tchetekelo. When an advanced unit composed of 500 Portuguese soldiers and Humbi auxiliaries under captain Luís Pinto de Almeida crossed the river, about 300 men were massacred in an ambush.

The Portuguese defeat was followed by a punitive expedition in 1905 and 1907, but not before 1916 Southern Angola was "pacified".

Notes

Sources

 António Aniceto Monteiro: The Conquest of Southern Angola (The Massacre, 25 September 1904)
 José Bento Duarte: Desastre do Vau do Pembe (Angola) – 25 de Setembro de 1904

Portuguese Angola
the Cunene
1904 in Angola